Hot Wire is the fourth studio album by English hard rock band Trapeze. Recorded with producer Neil Slaven at Island Studios in London and Lee Sound Studios, Birmingham, it was released in 1974 by Warner Bros. Records.

Background
Hot Wire was the first Trapeze album recorded since the departure of Glenn Hughes in 1973 to join Deep Purple, and the first to feature his replacement Pete Wright, as well as second guitarist Rob Kendrick. It was the second album by the band to be produced by Neil Slaven, and features eight songs written by guitarist and vocalist Mel Galley and his brother Tom (drummer Dave Holland co-wrote one track).

Reception

Music website AllMusic awarded Hot Wire three out of five stars. The album was the second by the band to chart on the US Billboard 200, reaching number 146.

Track listing

Personnel

Trapeze
Mel Galley – guitar, lead vocals, backing vocals (tracks 3, 5, 6 and 8), slide guitar (track 6), production
Rob Kendrick – guitar, backing vocals, production
Pete Wright – bass, backing vocals, production
Dave Holland – drums, tambourine (track 8), production

Additional musicians
Terry Rowley – synthesizers and backing vocals (tracks 3, 5, 6 and 7) organ (track 2), electric piano (track 8)
Kenny Cole – backing vocals (tracks 3, 5, 6 and 8)
Misty Browning – backing vocals (tracks 3, 5, 6 and 8)
John Ogden – congas (tracks 2, 3 and 8)
Chris Mercer – saxophone (tracks 2 and 6)

Production personnel
Neil Slaven – production
Rhett Davies – engineering
Dave Hutchins – engineering assistance
Don Stewart – engineering assistance

References

1974 albums
Trapeze (band) albums
Warner Records albums